Miss Universe 1997, the 46th Miss Universe pageant, was held on May 16, 1997, at the Miami Beach Convention Center in Miami Beach, Florida, United States. Brook Lee of the United States was crowned by Alicia Machado of Venezuela at the end of the event. 74 delegates competed in this year. This is the first Miss Universe edition to be produced by Donald Trump.

Results

Placements

Final Competition

Contestants

  - Nazarena Vanesa González Almada
  - Karen-Ann Peterson
  - Laura Csortan
  - Nestaea Sandra Sealy
  - Laurence Borremans
  - Sharon Dominguez
  - Naomi Darrell
  - Helga Bauer Salas
  - Jhane-Louise Landwier
  - Nayla Micherif
  - Melinda Penn
  - Krassmira Todorova
  - Carmen Kempt
  - Claudia Delpin
  - Claudia Elena Vásquez Ángel
  - Gabriela Aguilar Chavarría
  - Kristina Cherina
  - Verna Angela Maria Vasquez
  - Korina Nikolaou
  - Petra Minářová
  - Cesarina del Carmen Mejía Sánchez
  - María José López Verdu
  - Eiman Abdallah Thakeb
  - Carmen Irene Carrillo Vilanova
  - Kristiina Heinmets
  - Karita Hanna-Maria Tuomola
  - Patricia Spehar
  - Agathe Neuner
  - Elina Zisi
  - Carol Annabella Aquino Bonilla
  - Joselina García Cobos
  - Lee San-san
  - Ildikó Kecan
  - Solveig Lilja Guðmundsdóttir
  - Nafisa Joseph †
  - Fiona Mullally
  - Dikla Hamdy
  - Denny Méndez
  - Nadine Julian Thomas
  - Lee Eun-hee
  - Dalida Chammai
  - Trincy Low Ee Bing
  - Claire Grech
  - Cindy Cesar
  - Rebeca Tamez
  - Sheya Shipanga
  - Marina Alofagia McCartney
  - Melanie Sibetang
  - Lía Borrero
  - Rosanna Elizabeth Jiménez Pereira
  - Claudia Maria Dopf Scarsi
  - Abbygale Arenas
  - Agnieszka Zielinska
  - Lara Antunes
  - Ana Rosa Brito Suárez
  - Diana Maria Urdareanu
  - Anna Baitchik
  - Tricia Tan Siew Siew
  Slovak Republic    - Lucia Povrazníková
  - Mbali Gasa
  - Inés Sáinz Esteban
  - Victoria Lagerström
  - Melanie Winiger
  - Chio Hai Ta
  - Suangsuda Lawanprasert
  - Margot Rita Bourgeois
  - Yeşim Çetin
  - Keisha Delancy
  - Natalia Nadtochey
  - Adriana Cano García
  - Brook Lee
  - Vania Thomas
  - Marena Bencomo
  - Lorraine Magwenzi

Notes

Debut

Withdrawals
 
 
 
 
  — Liz Fuller didn't compete because by personal reasons.

Did not Compete
  – Miss Nicaragua 1996, Luz Maria Sanchez Herdocia did not participate because the television station that ran Miss Nicaragua (Canal 6) declared bankruptcy in April, and therefore they couldn't pay the entry fee.
  – Maryjane McKibben - She dropped out of the pageant after two days.

Returns
 Last competed in 1992
 
 Last competed in 1995

Replacements

  - The winner of Miss Universo Chile 1997, Hetu'u Rapu from Easter Island was replaced by her 1st runner-up, Claudia Delpín; because Hetu'u did not meet the age requirement of 18 to take part at Miss Universe 1997 by 17 days.
  - The winner of Miss Deutschland 1997, Nadine Schmidt elected not to participate at Miss Universe 1997, and she was replaced by her 3rd runner-up, Agathe Neunen because the other runners-up did not meet the age requirement of 18 to take part at Miss Universe. However, Schmidt later participated at Miss Baltic Sea 1997 and won the crown.

Awards
  - Miss Congeniality (Laura Csortan)
  - Miss Photogenic (Abbygale Arenas)
  - Best National Costume (Claudia Vásquez)

General references

References

1997
1997 in the United States
1997 beauty pageants
Beauty pageants in the United States
1997 in Florida
Events in Miami Beach, Florida
May 1997 events in the United States